The Fish Ponds and Crossing Place Trail Important Bird Area is a 1024 ha tract of land on the island of Middle Caicos in the Turks and Caicos Islands, a British Overseas Territory in the Lucayan Archipelago of the western Atlantic Ocean. It forms one of the territory's Important Bird Areas (IBAs).

Description
The IBA lies along the western part of the north coast of Middle Caicos. It includes the historical Crossing Bay Trail, which used to connect Middle Caicos to the crossing point to North Caicos, and the Fish Ponds wetlands. It is characterised by limestone cliffs, sea caves, ponds with subterranean connections to the sea, and small, offshore cays. Indian Cave is a dry, inland cave within the site.

Birds
The IBA was identified as such by BirdLife International because it supports a small breeding colony of West Indian whistling ducks as well as populations of American flamingos, white-tailed tropicbirds, laughing gulls, gull-billed terns, royal terns, least terns, Bahama woodstars and Bahama mockingbirds.

References

External links
 Crossing Place: a treasure of a trail

Important Bird Areas of the Turks and Caicos Islands